The Electoral district of North Eastern Boroughs was an electorate of the New South Wales Legislative Council at a time when some of its members were elected and the balance were appointed by the Governor. It was a new electorate created in 1851 by the expansion of the Legislative Council to 54, 18 to be appointed and 36 elected. The district consisted of the towns of Newcastle, Stockton and Raymond Terrace that had previously been part of Northumberland Boroughs.

In 1856 the unicameral Legislative Council was abolished and replaced with an elected Legislative Assembly and an appointed Legislative Council. The district was represented by the Legislative Assembly electorate of North Eastern Boroughs.

Members

Edward Flood went on to represent North Eastern Boroughs in the Legislative Assembly from 1856.

Election results

1851

References

Former electoral districts of New South Wales Legislative Council
1851 establishments in Australia
1856 disestablishments in Australia